A list of schools and libraries in Cumberland, Maryland:

Schools

Area colleges and universities
All of those listed are within a short drive from Cumberland, though only one is located in Cumberland itself.
 Allegany College of Maryland (Cumberland and Bedford & Somerset, Pennsylvania)
 Robert C. Byrd Institute (Rocket Center, West Virginia)
 Frostburg State University (Frostburg, Maryland)
 Potomac State College of West Virginia University (Keyser, West Virginia)
 Garrett College  (McHenry, Maryland)

Libraries
Approximately 39,000 people hold library cards in Allegany County ("Most citizens give libraries high grades", Cumberland Times News, October 10, 2006).  Regional Libraries include:
 Washington Street Library
 Frostburg Public Library
 Lavale Public Library
 South Cumberland Public Library, Allegany County
 Westernport Public Library, Allegany County
 Lewis J. Ort Library (Frostburg State University)
 Allegany College Library
 Western Maryland Public Library System

Cumberland, Maryland
Cumberland